Thomas Tulloch may refer to:

Thomas Tulloch (bishop of Ross) (died 1460/1461), Scottish prelate
Thomas Tulloch (bishop of Orkney) (died after 1461), Scottish prelate